Paralongidorus maximus is a plant pathogenic nematode infecting hemp.

See also 
 List of hemp diseases

References

External links 
 Nemaplex, University of California - Paralongidorus maximus

Enoplia
Hemp diseases
Agricultural pest nematodes